Peter "Pip" Borrman was an accomplished Australian aerobatics pilot. He was killed in a training accident in Shepparton, Victoria, on 25 February 2009.

References

1954 births
2009 deaths
Accidental deaths in Victoria (Australia)
Aerobatic pilots
Australian aviators
Aviators killed in aviation accidents or incidents in Australia
Victims of aviation accidents or incidents in 2009